Thecopus is a genus of flowering plants from the orchid family, Orchidaceae. It has two known species, native to Indochina and Borneo.

See also 
 List of Orchidaceae genera

References

External links 

Orchids of Asia
Cymbidieae genera
Cymbidiinae